Utsayantha Lake is a small reservoir located north of the village of Stamford in Delaware County, New York. The West Branch Delaware River flows through Utsayantha Lake.

History
Utsayantha Lake is named after Utsayantha, the daughter of Chief Ubiwacha. Chief Ubiwacha was the chief of the Lenape Indians. Utsayantha drowned herself in the lake after seeing her son drowned in the lake.

See also
 List of lakes in New York

References 

Lakes of New York (state)
Lakes of Delaware County, New York
Reservoirs in Delaware County, New York